Penstemon metcalfei is a species of flowering plant in the plantain family known by the common name Metcalfe's beardtongue. It is endemic to New Mexico in the United States, where it occurs in the Black Range.

It grows on steep canyon slopes and cliffs in remote coniferous forest habitat.

References

External links

metcalfei
Flora of New Mexico